Heuglin's bustard (Neotis heuglinii) is a species of bird in the bustard family.

Description 
The males weigh  and the much smaller females weigh . Other than size, sexes differ considerably in appearance. The striking male has a large back marking over the crown down the face to the chin with a bluish-grey neck. On the male, a chestnut band on the lower chest which is separated from the white belly by a thin black band. The female is much more of a subdued brownish color overall, with no bold black markings and has a face lined with faint slate-gray markings. In flight, the species reveals a white primary wedge on the otherwise dark upperwing, a feature obscured when the species is standing.

The Heuglin's bustard is found in Djibouti, Eritrea, Ethiopia, Kenya, and Somalia. It occurs in pairs or small groups in arid or semi-arid grasslands, even ranging into desert-edge.

References

Heuglin's bustard
Birds of the Horn of Africa
Heuglin's bustard
Taxonomy articles created by Polbot